Ira Jackson Jr. (born 28 January 1997) is an English professional footballer who plays as a forward for Isthmian League club Folkestone Invicta.

Jackson notably played in the Football League for Grimsby Town during the 2020–21 season, prior to this he had played Non-League football for Faversham Town, Ashford United, Ramsgate, Canterbury City, Lordswood, Whitstable Town, Worthing, Dover Athletic, Margate, Leatherhead, Sittingbourne and Folkestone Invicta.

Career

Early career
Jackson played for Faversham Town, Ashford United, Ramsgate, Canterbury City, Lordswood, Whitstable Town, Worthing, Dover Athletic, Margate, Leatherhead and Sittingbourne before joining Folkestone in the 2018-19 season.

Grimsby Town
On 11 August 2020, Jackson Jr. joined Grimsby Town on a two-year contract following a prolific season with Folkestone Invicta that saw him score 26 goals in 36 appearances in the Isthmian Premier Division. He made his debut for the club on 8 September 2020, in a 2–2 EFL Trophy group-stage draw with Harrogate Town, a match won by Grimsby 5–4 on penalties, with Jackson scoring the winning penalty in the shootout.  He made his league debut on 12 December 2020, coming off of the bench in the 57 minute before opening the scoring just six minutes later.

Following on from Grimsby's relegation from the Football League at the end of the 2020–21 season, Jackson was deemed surplus to requirements and was transfer listed by manager Paul Hurst with the player being made available on a free transfer.

On 6 September 2021, Jackson Jr. was released from his contract by mutual consent, he left the club having made 22 appearances in all competitions scoring 3 goals.

Wealdstone
On 7 September 2021, Jackson Jr. signed for National League side Wealdstone following his release from Grimsby. On 18 September, Jackson Jr. scored his first goal for the club on his full debut when he opened the scoring in a 2–2 draw with Aldershot Town. Jackson scored went on to score a total of 4 league goals in 23 appearances for Wealdstone, as well as finding the net in a Middlesex Charity Cup tie against Bedfont & Feltham. On 17 May 2022, it was announced that Jackson Jr. had left the club.

Return to Folkestone Invicta 
On 10 August 2022, Jackson Jr. returned to Folkestone Invicta.

Career statistics

References

1997 births
Living people
English footballers
People from Ashford, Kent
Footballers from Kent
Association football wingers
Faversham Town F.C. players
Ashford United F.C. players
Ramsgate F.C. players
Canterbury City F.C. players
Lordswood F.C. players
Whitstable Town F.C. players
Worthing F.C. players
Dover Athletic F.C. players
Margate F.C. players
Leatherhead F.C. players
Sittingbourne F.C. players
Folkestone Invicta F.C. players
Grimsby Town F.C. players
Wealdstone F.C. players
Isthmian League players
National League (English football) players
English Football League players
Black British sportspeople